Cape Range National Park  is a national park in the Gascoyne region of Western Australia,  north of Perth. The nearest town is Exmouth. Directly off the coast is the Ningaloo Reef. The area resulted from a gradual uplifting from the sea floor followed by fluctuating sea levels, wind and water erosion that have slowly eroded the range and plain leaving behind a range of rugged limestone, deep canyons and pristine beaches.

Overview
The Cape is the only elevated plateau composed of limestone on the North West Coast.

Yardie Creek, a spectacular gorge where the water is trapped by a sandbar, is located within the park.

Over 700 caves are located within the park and it is probable that many others remain undiscovered.
Over 630 species of wildflower are found within the park, that generally bloom toward the end of winter, including the bird flower and the desert sturt pea.

The area was under pastoral lease beginning in 1876 when J Brockman acquired leases in the area covering North West Cape to run cattle. Brockman sold parts of the lease in 1888 to ornithologist Thomas Carter including Yardie Creek and Ningaloo Station. Carter was the first settler in the area and established a pastoral station in 1889 The area was declared a national park in 1964, the off-shore area, Ningaloo Marine Park, was declared in 1987.

An abundance of flora and fauna are found within the park. Flora species include mangroves, acacia, spinifex, grevillea, verticordia, eucalyptus and minilya lily. Fauna found within the park include rock wallabies, red kangaroos, emus, euros, 100 different species of bird and 80 species of reptile.

References

External links

 Cape Range National Park

National parks of Western Australia
Shire of Exmouth
Protected areas established in 1965
Ningaloo Coast